Thomas Luce (1790 – 6 August 1875) was a British Whig politician.

Luce was first elected Whig MP for Malmesbury during the 1852 general election and held the seat until 1859 when he did not run in that year's general election.

References

External links
 

Whig (British political party) MPs for English constituencies
UK MPs 1852–1857
UK MPs 1857–1859
1790 births
1875 deaths